ButterFly is the sixteenth studio album by American singer Barbra Streisand. Released on October 1, 1974, by Columbia Records, it marked Streisand's first album of entirely new material in over three years. Primarily a contemporary pop record recorded throughout 1974, it also incorporates music from the reggae and R&B genres. All of the tracks on ButterFly are cover songs produced by Streisand's then-boyfriend Jon Peters, originating from artists like Bob Marley, David Bowie, Evie Sands, and Graham Nash.

The album received mixed reviews from music critics who questioned whether or not Peters' experience in the music industry was enough for him to produce an entire album. However, Tom Scott's involvement with the album was praised, particularly his position as an arranger. Commercially, the album peaked in the lower positions of Australia, Canada, and the United States. It would later be certified gold by the Recording Industry Association of America for physical shipments exceeding 500,000 copies. "Guava Jelly" and "Jubilation" were released as the album's two singles in December 1974 and April 1975, respectively. The 8-track cartridge and cassette tape versions used a different cover photo from the LP's fly on a stick of butter; the alternate cover shows an illustration of Streisand's face and hair surrounded by colorful butterflies.

Background and recording 
Earlier in January 1974, Streisand released The Way We Were and the official soundtrack to the film The Way We Were (1973), both of which were commercially successful, with the former album selling over 2 million copies in the United States. The Way We Were predominantly featured material from Streisand's unreleased album The Singer, with only three tracks recorded specifically for the new project. ButterFly was Streisand's first album of completely new material in over three years and was produced solely by her then-boyfriend, Jon Peters. Due to Peters' minimal experience in the music industry, it was suggested by AllMusic's William Ruhlmann that the album's overall sound was orchestrated more by saxophonist Tom Scott rather than Peters. Streisand also collaborated with several composers and musicians for ButterFly, including John Bahler, Hank Cicalo, John Guerin, and Clarence McDonald.

Recording sessions for the album took place at A&M Studios and United-Western Recorders in Los Angeles between February and July 1974. "I Won't Last a Day Without You", "Since I Don't Have You", and "Crying Time" were amongst the earliest tracks to be recorded, all during a session on March 25, 1974 at United-Western. The remaining tracks on the album were all recorded throughout July 1974 at A&M Studios. Scott and composer Lee Holdridge handled the arrangement of the ten tracks, while John Bahler arranged the horns and vocal production. Streisand and Columbia Records released ButterFly on October 1, 1974 as her sixteenth studio album overall, distributed months after The Way We Were. The same label issued the album as an 8-track cartridge in 1974, with the track listing switching the order of "Jubilation" and "Crying Time" around. The album was later released in a compact disc format on October 25, 1990.

Album cover 
Jon Peters designed the Butterfly album cover, using a fly on a stick of butter. Butter-fly! “I just threw it out,” he said, “and this is where Barbra is totally insane. I said butter and a fly – Butterfly. She said, ‘Great!’ And that was it. The front cover was done.”

Carl Furuta was the photographer hired to create the cover image of the Butterfly album. “It had to be a dead fly,” he recalled, “so we had to go to a garbage can and put a bag over a fly and let him suffocate to death. Then you had to spread out his wings and his feet with tweezers. We went through a lot of flies. And maybe the butter melted under the lights. But to me it was just another job.”

Music and lyrics 

On ButterFly, Streisand departed from the pop and rock influences that were strong on her previous efforts and instead relied more on a variety of experimental, contemporary pop music. The singer also explored the reggae and classic R&B genres that were, at the time, popular on mainstream radio. The album opens with a "seductive" version of "Love in the Afternoon", a song originally performed by American singer Evie Sands earlier in 1974. It was written by Sands, Ben Geminaro, and Richard Wiseman; production of "Love in the Afternoon" and all songs on ButterFly were solely handled by Peters. "Guava Jelly" is track two and a cover of Bob Marley's 1971 single. One of the reggae songs on the album, it features "risqué lyrics" that suggest that guava jelly could be used as a type of sexual lubricant. Bill Withers's R&B ballad "Grandma's Hands" follows and is primarily a "gospel-flavored" song. Lyrically, it details a woman who shares a strong bond with her grandmother. "I Won't Last a Day Without You" is the fourth track and a cover of the Carpenters' 1974 single; it was written by Paul Williams and Roger Nichols. The album's second and final single, "Jubilation", was a song made famous by Paul Anka in 1972. In response to Streisand's rendition of the track, Anka questioned her decision to have Peters produce but remarked, "Barbra can sing the phone book. She has no problem singing anything. She's got one of the great voices".

Track six is "Simple Man", originally performed by Graham Nash for his debut album, Songs for Beginners (1971). Written about an individual getting over a bad relationship, Nash wrote the song immediately after breaking up with his then-girlfriend Joni Mitchell. David Bowie's "Life on Mars" is the seventh track, also written by Bowie. During an interview with Playboy in 1975, Bowie was asked what he thought regarding Streisand's cover; disappointed, he claimed that it was "bloody awful" and "atrocious". The preceding track ("Since I Don't Have You") was written by seven of the band members from the Skyliners and advertised as a "classic" on ButterFly. "Crying Time" and "Let the Good Times Roll" finish off the record, serving as the ninth and tenth tracks, respectively. The former song was written by Buck Owens, originally performed by Ray Charles, and previously recorded by Streisand during a live television special called Barbra Streisand…and Other Musical Instruments in 1973. Author Francis David compared Streisand's vocal capabilities on the track to those of Aretha Franklin's. Meanwhile, "Let the Good Times Roll" is a cover of the 1956 Shirley & Lee original. Written by Leonard Lee and Shirley Goodman, Goodman does not receive a writing credit on the album's official liner notes and would later take Lee to federal court to receive credit.

Singles 
The album's lead single "Guava Jelly" was released as a 7" record on December 16, 1974, two months after the release of ButterFly. It was paired with "Love in the Afternoon" and "Life on Mars" as a B-side track in the United States and the Netherlands, respectively. "Jubilation" was the record's second and final single, released in April 1975 by Columbia in the same physical formats as "Guava Jelly". On the Germany release of "Jubilation", it would be paired with B-side "Crying Time", but the Canada and United States versions featured "Let the Good Times Roll" instead.

Critical reception 

ButterFly has received mixed reviews from music critics. In a highly positive review, a critic from Billboard described it as "possibly the finest LP Ms. Streisand has ever come up with, artistically and commercially". The reviewer lauded her vocals and her ability to adapt to the music while also taking a liking to Peters' production capabilities. The critic also recommended "Love in the Afternoon", "Guava Jelly", "Grandma's Hands", "Jubilation", "Life on Mars", "Since I Don't Have You", and "Let the Good Times Roll" as the album's "best cuts". Despite being Streisand's first collection of new material in approximately three years, AllMusic's Ruhlmann was disappointed by the singer's decision to work with Peters on the album. He felt that Peters' background in the music industry was "nonexistent" and instead highlighted Tom Scott, the album's arranger, as the "real power on the album". Concluding, Ruhlmann claimed that although ButterFly is a charming album, it ultimately only sold to Streisand's fan base rather than the general public.

Ben Gerson from Rolling Stone called the songs on the album "forgettable" and "unconvincing". He also criticized Streisand's authenticity when singing lyrics that he considered "meaningless from the lips of an American". Because of the lackluster response generated from the record, Streisand decided to work with new musicians on her following album, Lazy Afternoon (1975). Her decision pleased both critics and her fans, who felt that the new album was stronger than ButterFly. Years later in 1991, Streisand took to Larry King Live and announced her complete displeasure with ButterFly and the songs on it. She deemed it as her least favorite album and joked that she would like to withdraw it from her catalog altogether.

Commercial performance 
In the United States, ButterFly debuted at number 72 on the Billboard 200 chart for the week ending November 16, 1974. The following week it rose to number 52 and on January 4, 1975, it reached its peak position at number 13. The record spent a total of 24 consecutive weeks on the Billboard 200. ButterFly was commercially less successful than its predecessor, which topped the Billboard 200. However, due to the album's strong sales, the Recording Industry Association of America (RIAA) certified ButterFly gold on January 6, 1975, for physical shipments exceeding 500,000 copies. In Canada, the album peaked at a slightly higher position. It debuted on the list, compiled by RPM, at number 92 on November 23, 1974, and 11 weeks later it would peak at number 11 on February 15, 1975. In total, it spent 17 weeks charting in that country. It also charted in Australia, where it peaked at number 49 according to the Kent Music Report.

Track listing 

All tracks produced by Jon Peters.

Personnel 
Credits adapted from the liner notes of the CD edition of ButterFly.

 Barbra Streisand vocals, backing vocals
 John Bahler horn and vocal arrangements 
 Ben Benay guitar
 Max Bennett bass guitar
 Larry Carlton guitar
 Gary Coleman percussion
 King Errisson congas
 John Guerin drums
 Lee Holdridge arrangements 
 Clarence McDonald keyboards
 Tom Scott arrangements , woodwind, flute, tenor saxophone
Technical
 Jon Peters production, art direction, album design
 Hank Cicalo engineer 
 Michael Lietz engineer 
 Steve Schapiro inside photography
 Bill Shirley back cover artwork
 Carl Furuta front photography

Charts

Certifications

References

Citations

Bibliography

External links 
 
 Butterfly (1974) at Barbra Archives

1974 albums
Albums arranged by Lee Holdridge
Barbra Streisand albums
Columbia Records albums
Albums recorded at United Western Recorders
Albums recorded at A&M Studios